Caney Springs Cumberland Presbyterian Church is a historic church at the junction of Arkansas Highway 289 and Izard County Road 70 (Walter Hall Road), near Sage, Arkansas.  It is a modest rectangular Plain Traditional structure set on fieldstone piers and topped by a gabled corrugated metal roof.  The interior has a single large room, with plank flooring and flush-boarded walls.  The pews, original to the building's 1889 construction, were handcrafted by the congregation.  The church is a well-preserved example of a once-common type of church found in the region.

The building was listed on the National Register of Historic Places in 1995.

See also
National Register of Historic Places listings in Izard County, Arkansas

References

Presbyterian churches in Arkansas
Churches on the National Register of Historic Places in Arkansas
Churches in Izard County, Arkansas
Wooden churches in Arkansas
Cumberland Presbyterian Church
National Register of Historic Places in Izard County, Arkansas
1889 establishments in Arkansas
Churches completed in 1889